The Saint Vincent and the Grenadines Football Federation (SVGFF) is the governing body of football in the island state of Saint Vincent and the Grenadines. It was founded in 1979 but only gained ascension into FIFA in 1988. Currently based in Kingstown, it oversees all aspects of football in Saint Vincent and the Grenadines including the Saint Vincent and the Grenadines national football team and the NLA Premier League.

Executive committee

Source: Saint Vincent and the Grenadines Football Federation

References

External links

Facebook
Twitter
SVGFF Championship
St. Vincent and the Grenadines at FIFA website
St. Vincent and the Grenadines at CONCACAF site

CONCACAF member associations
Football in Saint Vincent and the Grenadines
Football
Sports organizations established in 1979
1979 establishments in Saint Vincent and the Grenadines